Dirty Three is the self-titled second major recording by Australian trio, the Dirty Three. The album was recorded between 1993 and 1994 at Studio 325, Melbourne, Australia. ‘Kim’s Dirt’ is a longer version to the trio's other recording of the track, which is on their previous release Sad & Dangerous.

Cover art by guitarist Mick Turner.

Track listing
 "Indian Love Song" – 10:11
 "Better Go Home Now" – 3:43
 "Odd Couple" – 5:09
 "Kim's Dirt" (Kim Salmon) – 11:48
 "Everything's Fucked" – 5:32
 "The Last Night" – 6:55
 "Dirty Equation" – 6:02

Personnel
Dirty Three
Warren Ellis - violin, space belt, piano, accordion, kalimba
Jim White - drums, percussion
Mick Turner - guitar, cover artwork
with:
 Tony Wyzenbeek - harmonica
 Annie Hormer - rear sleeve photography
 Karen H. - Dirty Three photography
 Phil McKellar - producer, engineer

References

1995 albums
Dirty Three albums
Touch and Go Records albums

it:Dirty Three